Saint Faustina may refer to:

Saint Faustina (Como), 6th-century Italian nun, feast day January 18
 Saint Faustina Kowalska (1905–1938), Polish mystic, feast day October 5

See also
 Saint Faustinus (disambiguation)

fr:Sainte Faustine